The Valea din Jos is a right tributary of the Mureș in Mureș County, Romania. It flows into the Mureș near Oarba de Mureș.

References

Rivers of Romania
Rivers of Mureș County